The Division of Throsby was an Australian electoral division in the state of New South Wales. The division was named after Charles Throsby, a prominent pioneer and explorer in the early nineteenth century of the areas to the south of Sydney.

Located in the Illawarra, the division covered eastern Wingecarribee Shire, extending from Exeter, Lake Yarrunga and Upper Kangaroo Valley in the south to Aylmerton, Alpine, the Avon Dam, Lake Avon, Dombarton, and Kembla Grange in the north to the Pacific Ocean in the east at Port Kembla, including the northern part of the City of Shellharbour and the southern portion of the adjacent City of Wollongong. Before its abolition, it included Albion Park, Berkeley, Berrima, Blackbutt, Bowral, Cringila, Dapto, Exeter, Fitzroy Falls, Horsley, Kembla Grange, Lake Illawarra, Mittagong, Moss Vale, Oak Flats, Port Kembla, Robertson, Warrawong, Welby, Willow Vale, and parts of Warilla.

The Division of Throsby was created in a redistribution in 1984 and had been represented by Labor since its inception. The Illawarra is one of the few non-metropolitan regions where Labor consistently does well. The area has a strong working-class character due to the presence of industries such as steelmaking, coal mining and stevedoring.

It was renamed the Division of Whitlam in 2016.

Renaming to Whitlam
In honour of former Prime Minister Gough Whitlam, the Australian Electoral Commission announced in 2015 that it would rename the Division of Throsby as the Division of Whitlam, to take effect at the 2016 federal election.

There were two formally lodged objections for renaming Throsby to Whitlam on the basis that the former Prime Minister's connection with the Illawarra area, particularly in the seat of Throsby, is limited to non-existent, and that it would be better suited to rename Whitlam's old parliamentary seat of Werriwa in his honour. One of the objections lodged by a Councillor of Wollongong Council stated the matter was "hotly debated in the Wollongong community since the announcement" and that council had voted against supporting the proposed change.

However, the change took effect on 25 February 2016.

Members

Election results

References

External links
 Division of Whitlam, Australian Electoral Commission

Former electoral divisions of Australia
Constituencies established in 1984
Constituencies established in 2016
Constituencies disestablished in 2016
1984 establishments in Australia
2016 establishments in Australia
2016 disestablishments in Australia